Almestrone (developmental code names Ba 38372, Ciba 38372), also known as 7α-methylestrone, is a synthetic, steroidal estrogen which was synthesized in 1967 but was never marketed. It is used as a precursor in the synthesis of several highly active steroids.

See also 
 List of estrogens
 7α-Methylestradiol

References 

Abandoned drugs
Phenols
Estranes
Estrogens
Ketones